C. T. Rajakantham (1917–2002) was a Tamil stage and film actress.  She was the mother-in-law of playback singer Tiruchi Loganathan and grandmother of playback singers and popular music show judges T. L. Maharajan and Deepan Chakkravarthy

Early life 

Rajakantham was born in Coimbatore in about 1917. Once while staging a play in the city, the members of a drama troupe headed by S. R. Janaki stayed at a house owned by Rajakantham's father. Impressed by her acting skills, Janaki inducted Rajakantham in her troupe. Starting with minor roles, Rajakantham later formed a successful comedy duo with veteran comedian Kali N. Rathnam. Rajakantham made her debut in the 1941 movie Sabapathy alongside Rathnam.

Filmography

Television
Marmadesam Vidathu Karuppu as Pechi, 1998 - 1999.

References 

 

1917 births
1999 deaths
Actresses from Tamil Nadu
Indian film actresses
Indian stage actresses
People from Coimbatore